Tower M, formerly known as the KLCC East Gate Tower, is a proposed megatall skyscraper project in Kuala Lumpur, Malaysia situated within the Kuala Lumpur City Centre (KLCC). KLCC Property Holdings Berhad, which was also responsible for the development of the Petronas Twin Towers, is currently developing the building as part of the revised KLCC Development Master Plan 1995. The masterplan was reviewed in 2012 to enhance the development potential of the development's remaining undeveloped parcels.

The Tower M precinct will consist of three office towers on top of a retail podium and come upon four acres of land named Lots L, L1 and M next to Pesiaran KLCC MRT Station, previously KLCC East on the upcoming Putrajaya Line. In July 2018, KLCCH which is the landowner stated that there are no immediate plans to construct the office towers. If the demand arises, planning is unlikely to start before the year 2035.

Progress 
The piling and foundation works for the tower started in early 2019. Foundation works of the tower goes deep into the ground as 130 to 150m depth on the base of the tower. Works of it had to be done along with the construction of the upcoming MRT underground station due to the strict requirement of movements on the structure.

The first phase of the Tower M precinct is a 6-storey retail podium building and a gallery space for Petronas under the masterplan. The mall would be integrated with the upcoming MRT station served by the Putrajaya Line which is scheduled to be completed by early 2023. The structure of the building is designed in the form of cantilever and atypical facade. The construction of its retail component commenced in July 2019 while part of Phase 1 is being developed by Samsung C&T (KL) Sdn Bhd, a subsidiary of the Samsung C&T Corp.

Transportation 
The tower will be served by the  Persiaran KLCC MRT station which is located underneath Jalan Binjai and would also serve the whole KLCC district. The station is not connected to any interchange.

References

External links 

 KLCC Property Holdings official website

Skyscrapers in Kuala Lumpur
Proposed skyscrapers
Proposed buildings and structures in Malaysia